Fr. Kevin Flannery (born 12 August 1950, Cleveland, Ohio) is a Catholic moral philosopher, author, and professor. He is a professor of the history of ancient philosophy at the Pontifical Gregorian University. He entered the Society of Jesus in 1977. He has served as a consultor of the Sacred Congregation for the Doctrine of the Faith since 2002.

He has been a member of the Pontifical Academy of Saint Thomas Aquinas since 2004, and is a past-president of the American Catholic Philosophical Association. He was appointed as the holder of Creighton's Anna and Donald Waite Endowed Chair in Jesuit Education for the 2020–2021 academic year.

Books 

 Ways into the Logic of Alexander of Aphrodisias
 Christian and Moral Action and Action
 Character According to Aristotle: The Logic of the Moral Life
 Cooperation with Evil: Thomistic Tools of Analysis.

References 

Pontifical Gregorian University alumni
21st-century American philosophers
Catholic philosophers
Pontifical Gregorian University rectors
1950 births
Living people